Mirage Magazine is an international fashion and culture magazine headquartered in Paris, France. It was founded in 2009.

Background
Mirage, founded in 2009 by Henrik Purienne and Frank Rocholl, is an annual 400-page fashion and culture magazine inspired by the photographic aesthetic and hedonistic culture of the 1960s and 1970s. The magazine intends to revive and reflect upon the spirit of artists such as The Velvet Underground, The Doors and Nick Drake. It also draws and reflects upon architects such as John Lautner, and Paolo Soleri; designers such as Massimo Vignelli, and Marcello Gandini; and fashion icons such as Lauren Hutton, Anita Pallenberg, and Betty Catroux.

Content
Mirage Magezine focuses on timeless aesthetics in the fields of architectural, automotive, and product design, combined with features about forgotten utopias and influential creative personalities like Robert Evans and Peter Saville. Its fashion stories often reflect the personal relationship of photographers and models, with key themes including summer, sun, youth, freedom and rebellion. The magazine's contributor list includes Jason Lee Parry, Jonathan Leder, Matteo Montanari, Andrew Kuykendall, Ana Kras, Akila Berjaoui, and Quentin de Briey.

Mirage was launched in 2009 in Colette, Paris. It then distributed globally and expanded to markets in the US, Canada, Australia and Great Britain. In June 2010, Mirage was nominated for the German Design Award, and it won a Print Star in Gold in 2013 for high printing quality.

Awards
 2013 Print Star Gold Award. Award of the German Printing Industry. Category: Best Printed Fashion Magazine
 2011 German Design Award. Nominated by the Ministry of Economics of the German state of Hessen
 2010 Design Award. Category: Communication Design for Mirage Magazine

References

External links
 Highsnobiety Review
 GoSee Mirage Info
 Perfectlounge, Review
 Nowearland

Cultural magazines
Women's magazines published in France
Magazines established in 2009
Women's fashion magazines
Annual magazines
2009 establishments in France
Magazines published in Paris